The 1990 Calder Cup playoffs of the American Hockey League began on April 4, 1990. The eight teams that qualified, four from each division, played best-of-seven series for Division Semifinals and Division Finals. The division champions played a best-of-seven series for the Calder Cup.  The Calder Cup Final ended on May 18, 1990, with the Springfield Indians defeating the Rochester Americans four games to two to win the Calder Cup for the sixth time in team history.  Despite an injury preventing him from playing in the final game, Springfield goaltender Jeff Hackett won the Jack A. Butterfield Trophy as the MVP of the playoffs.

The league instituted trophies for division champions in the playoffs; the Richard F. Canning Trophy in the North Division, and the Robert W. Clarke Trophy in the South Division.

Playoff seeds
After the 1989-90 AHL regular season, the top four teams from each division qualified for the playoffs. The Sherbrooke Canadiens finished the regular season with the best overall record for the second straight season.

Northern Division
Sherbrooke Canadiens - 102 points
Cape Breton Oilers - 85 points
Springfield Indians - 80 points
Halifax Citadels - 80 points

Southern Division
Rochester Americans - 95 points
Adirondack Red Wings - 95 points
Baltimore Skipjacks - 93 points
Utica Devils - 92 points

Bracket

In each round, the team that earned more points during the regular season receives home ice advantage, meaning they receive the "extra" game on home-ice if the series reaches the maximum number of games. There is no set series format due to arena scheduling conflicts and travel considerations.

Division Semifinals 
Note: Home team is listed first.

Northern Division

(1) Sherbrooke Canadiens vs. (4) Halifax Citadels

(2) Cape Breton Oilers vs. (3) Springfield Indians

Southern Division

(1) Rochester Americans vs. (4) Utica Devils

(2) Adirondack Red Wings vs. (3) Baltimore Skipjacks

Division Finals

Northern Division

(1) Sherbrooke Canadiens vs. (3) Springfield Indians

Southern Division

(1) Rochester Americans vs. (3) Baltimore Skipjacks

Calder Cup Final

(S1) Rochester Americans vs. (N3) Springfield Indians

See also
1989–90 AHL season
List of AHL seasons

References

Calder Cup
Calder Cup playoffs